Julius Feige (July 10, 1861 – February 24, 1918) was an American businessman and politician.

Feige was born in Milwaukee, Wisconsin and went to Milwaukee parochial and public schools. He was a businessman. Feige served in the Wisconsin Assembly from 1897 to 1901 as a Republican. In 1906, Feige moved to West Allis, Wisconsin where he died.

Notes

External links

1861 births
1918 deaths
19th-century American politicians
Politicians from Milwaukee
People from West Allis, Wisconsin
Businesspeople from Milwaukee
20th-century American politicians
19th-century American businesspeople
Republican Party members of the Wisconsin State Assembly